Søndermark Cemetery (Danish: Søndermark Kirkegård) is a cemetery in the Frederiksberg district of Copenhagen, Denmark, located on Roskildevej, opposite Solbjerg Park Cemetery. It is the youngest of the three cemeteries in Frederiksberg Municipality.

History
The cemetery was designed by the landscape architect Gudmund Nyeland Brandt.

Chapel and crematorium complex
A competition for a combined crematorium and chapel was held in 1926 and won by Edvard Thomsen and Frits Schlegel. The complex, which in part differs from their winning proposal, was built from 1927 to 1930, and is one of the earliest examples of Modernism in religious architecture in Denmark. The facade front is decorated with a large relief designed by Einar Utzon-Frank.

The Birkelunden area was inaugurated in 1963.

Søndermark Cemetery today

To the north the cemetery is bound by a brick wall along Roskildevej. A gate opens into an avenue which leads to the chapel in the chapel-crematorium complex. Apart from the Birkelunden area, the layout is traditional and vegetation is kept low.

Interments
 Ove Abildgaard
 Ebba Amfeldt (Birkelunden)
 Tove Bang (Birkelunden)
 Aage Bendixen (Birkelunden)
 Jytte Breuning
 Christel
 Gösta Schwarck
 Benjamin Christensen (Birkelunden)
 John Christmas Møller
 Jørgen Clevin (Birkelunden)
 Lilian Ellis (nedlagt)
 Christian Flagstad (Birkelunden)
 Erik Frederiksen (Birkelunden)
 William Fridericia (Birkelunden)
 Flemming Geill
 Astrid Henning-Jensen (Birkelunden)
 Bjarne Henning-Jensen (Birkelunden)
 Inge Hvid-Møller (Birkelunden)
 Else Hvidhøj (Birkelunden)
 Otto Hænning
 Kjeld Ingrisch (Birkelunden)
 Ingeborg Irminger
 Valdemar Irminger
 Ellen Jansø
 Kai Julian (Birkelunden)
 Preben Kaas (Birkelunden)
 Ole Kiilerich
 Gunnar Lauring (Birkelunden)
 Mogens Lind (nedlagt)
 Otto Lington (Birkelunden)
 Lone Luther (Birkelunden)
 Lis Løwert
 Johannes Marott (Birkelunden)
 Ole Monty (Birkelunden)
 Henning Møller
 Svend-Erik Nørregaard
 Knud Pheiffer
 Børge Roger-Henrichsen (Birkelunden)
 Jørgen Roos
 Karl Roos
 Noemi Roos
 Franz Šedivý
 Bodil Steen (Birkelunden)
 Karl Stegger (Birkelunden)
 Inger Stender (Birkelunden)
 Elga Olga Svendsen (Birkelunden)
 Knud Vad Thomsen (Birkelunden)
 Valdemar Vester
 Bjørn Watt Boolsen
 Arne Weel (Birkelunden)
 Henning Wellejus
 Bent Werther (Birkelunden)
 Hanne Winther-Jørgensen (Birkelunden)
 Inge Østergaard (nedlagt)
Gwili Andre
Danny Bengtsen

See also

 Parks and open spaces in Copenhagen

References

Cemeteries in Copenhagen
Lutheran cemeteries
1929 establishments in Denmark
Cemeteries established in the 1920s